Mab, or Uranus XXVI, is an inner satellite of Uranus. It was discovered by Mark R. Showalter and Jack J. Lissauer in 2003 using the Hubble Space Telescope. It was named after Queen Mab, a fairy queen from English folklore who is mentioned in William Shakespeare's play Romeo and Juliet.

Because the moon is small and dark, it was not seen in the heavily scrutinized images taken by Voyager 2 during its Uranus flyby in 1986. However, it is brighter than another moon, Perdita, which was discovered from Voyager's photos in 1997. This led scientists to re-examine the old photos again, and the satellite was finally found in the images.

The size of Mab is not known exactly. If it is as dark as Puck, it is about 24 km in diameter. On the other hand, if it is brightly coloured like the neighbouring moon Miranda, it would be even smaller than Cupid and comparable to the smallest outer satellites.

Mab is heavily perturbed. The actual source for perturbation is still unclear, but is presumed to be one or more of the nearby orbiting moons.

Mab orbits at the same distance from Uranus as the μ ring (formerly known as R/2003 U 1), a recently discovered dusty ring. The moon is nearly the optimal size for dust production, since larger moons can recollect the escaping dust and smaller moons have too small surface areas for supplying the ring via ring particle or meteoroid collisions. No rings associated with Perdita and Cupid have been found, probably because Belinda limits the lifetimes of dust they generate.

Following its discovery, Mab was given the temporary designation S/2003 U 1. The moon is also designated Uranus XXVI.

See also 
 Moons of Uranus

References

External links 
 Hubble Uncovers Smallest Moons Yet Seen Around Uranus – Hubble Space Telescope news release (25 September 2003)
 NASA's Hubble Discovers New Rings and Moons Around Uranus – Hubble Space Telescope news release (22 December 2005)
 Hubble detects two large outer rings, two new moons orbiting Uranus (Courtesy of Astronomy Magazine 2005)
 Uranus' Known Satellites (by Scott S. Sheppard)

Moons of Uranus
20030825
Moons with a prograde orbit
Romeo and Juliet